Cerochlamys is a genus of plants in the family Aizoaceae. They are all succulent plants, with fleshy, water-storing leaves. These plants bear small, somewhat daisy-like flowers, usually in shades of pink or purple.

Species 
Cerochlamys gemina (L.Bolus) H.E.K.Hartmann
Cerochlamys pachyphylla (L.Bolus) L.Bolus
Cerochlamys trigona N.E.Br

References 

Aizoaceae
Aizoaceae genera
Taxa named by N. E. Brown